Anastylosis (from the Ancient Greek: ; ,  = "again", and  = "to erect [a stela  or building]") is an archaeological term for a reconstruction technique whereby a ruined building or monument is restored using the original architectural elements to the greatest degree possible, combined with modern materials if necessary, ensuring that the latter are unobtrusive while clearly recognizable as replacement materials. It is also sometimes used to refer to a similar technique for restoring broken pottery and other small objects.

Methodology 
The intent of anastylosis is to rebuild, from as much of the original materials that is left after hundreds or even thousands of years of abuse, historical architectural monuments which have fallen into ruin. This is done by placing components back into their original positions. Where standing buildings are at risk of collapse, the method may entail the preparation of drawings and measurements, piece-by-piece disassembly, and careful reassembly, with new materials as required for structural integrity; occasionally this may include new foundations. When elements or parts are missing, modern materials (of restoration grade) may be substituted, such as plaster, cement, and synthetic resins.

The international Venice Charter of 1964 details criteria for anastylosis. First, the original condition of the structure must be confirmed scientifically. Second, the proper placement of each recovered component must be determined. Third, supplemental components must be limited to those necessary for stability (that is, substitute components may never lie at the top), and must be recognizable as replacement materials. New construction for the sake of filling in apparent lacunae is not allowed.

Criticism 
Anastylosis has its detractors in the scientific community. In effect, the method poses several problems:
 No matter how rigorous preparatory studies are, any errors of interpretation will result in errors, often undetectable or incorrigible, in reconstruction.
 Damage to the original components is practically inevitable.
 An element may be, or may have been reused in, or may have originated in, different buildings or monuments from different periods. To use it in one reconstruction obviates its use in others.

Examples

Greece

A primitive anastylosis was carried out in 1836 at the Acropolis in Athens, where the Temple of Athena Nike was re-erected from remaining parts. Starting in 1902, the Greek architect Nikolas Balanos used anastylosis in order to restore a collapsed portion of the Parthenon, restore the Erechtheion, and rebuild the Nike Temple a second time. Iron clamps and plugs which had been used earlier had started to rust and had caused heavy damage to the original structure. These were removed and replaced with precious metal clamps. When the temple was once again rebuilt additional newly identified original fragments were added. Currently, anastylosis is being applied to the Parthenon.

India
Several monuments protected by the Archeological Survey of India have been restored, including Shekhavati havelis, Humayun's Tomb, etc.

Indonesia

Early in the 20th century, Dutch archaeologists carried out anastylosis of the stupa at the Buddhist temple complex at Borobudur in Java, Indonesia between 1907 and 1911. The Prambanan Hindu temple complex was excavated and was partially reconstructed between 1911 and 1953, also reconstructed using anastylosis method. The recent practice of anastylosis in Indonesia is the reconstruction of Kedulan temple, built in 869, the temple was buried under volcanic layers for centuries, until it was discovered in 1993. The restoration of the entire Kedulan Temple complex was expected to be completed by the end of 2018.

Cambodia
The École Française d'Extrême-Orient (EFEO) began restoration work at Angkor Wat in 1908. Between 1986 and 1992, the Archaeological Survey of India (ASI) carried out restoration work on the temple. Bayon was restored by EFCO followed by Japanese Government Team for the Safeguarding of Angkor (JSA). Ta Prohm is being restored by the Archaeological Survey of India.

Turkey

Aphrodisias has several buildings sufficiently well preserved to allow such anastylosis: the Tetrapylon (1983–90); the east end of the Sebasteion's South Building (2000–2012); the Doric logeion of the Theatre (2011–2012); and the Propylon of the Sebasteion complex (2012– ).

Others

 Temple of Heracles in Agrigento, Italy
 Temple of Debod in Madrid, Spain
 Roman Theatre of Cartagena, Spain
 , Libya
 Stari Most, Mostar, Bosnia and Herzegovina
 Odeion in Troy, Turkey
 Temple of Trajan, Pergamon, Turkey
 Al Khazneh, Petra, Jordan
 King's funerary complex at Djoser, Egypt by Jean-Philippe Lauer (1926–2001)
 Red Chapel at Karnak, Egypt
 Cretan Palace at Knossos, Crete, by the archaeologist Arthur John Evans
 South Palace at Vat Phu, Laos
 Mỹ Sơn, Vietnam
Temple of Garni, Armenia
 Notre Dame de Paris, France

Proposals
The Buddhas of Bamyan in Afghanistan which were destroyed by the Taliban in 2001 are under consideration for anastylosis. Archaeologists have estimated that as much as 50% of the statues' material is recoverable.

It would be possible to reconstruct the Gourgion Tower in Gozo, Malta using anastylosis, since many of its decorated stones and inscriptions were retrieved following its destruction in 1943 by the United States, and are now in storage at Heritage Malta.

Following the recapture of Palmyra by the Syrian Army in March 2016, director of antiquities Maamoun Abdelkarim stated that the Temple of Bel, the Temple of Baalshamin and the Monumental Arch, which had been destroyed by the Islamic State of Iraq and the Levant in 2015, will be rebuilt using anastylosis.

See also 
 Reconstruction (architecture)

References

Sources 
 (German) Adolf Borbein, Tonio Hölscher, Paul Zanker (Hrsg.): Klassische Archäologie. Eine Einführung. Reimer, Berlin 2000,  (darin: Hans-Joachim Schalles: Archäologie und Denkmpalpflege. S. 52 ff. Gottfried Gruben: Klassische Bauforschung. S. 251 ff.)
 (German) Gruben, Gottfried: Anastilosis in Griechenland In: Anita Rieche u.a. (Hrsg.): Grabung – Forschung – Präsentation. Festschrift Gundolf Precht. Zabern, Mainz 2002. S. 327–338. (Xantener Berichte, Band 12) 
 (German) Klaus Nohlen: Anastilosis und Entwurf. In: Istanbuler Mitteilungen, Bd. 54 (2004), S. 35–54. .
 (German) Hartwig Schmidt: Wiederaufbau. Denkmalpflege an archäologischen Stätten, Bd. 2, hrsg. vom Architekturreferat des Deutschen Archäologischen Instituts. Theiss, Stuttgart 1993. 
 (German) Michael Petzet, Gert Mader: Praktische Denkmalpflege. Kohlhammer Verlag, Stuttgart 1993. ; v. a. S. 86 ff. und 98 ff.

External links 
 Article on Bamyan Buddhas (ICOMOS)

Translated from the French language article and the German language article 10 May 2006.

Architectural conservation
Conservation and restoration of cultural heritage
Methods in archaeology
Building